Françoise Rosay (born Françoise Bandy de Nalèche; 19 April 1891 – 28 March 1974) was a French opera singer, diseuse, and actress who enjoyed a film career of over sixty years and who became a legendary figure in French cinema. She went on to appear in over 100 movies in her career.

Life and career
Rosay was born Françoise Bandy de Nalèche in Paris, the illegitimate daughter of Marie-Thérèse Chauvin, an actress known as Sylviac. She originally planned to become an opera singer, and in 1917, won a prize at the Paris Conservatoire and made her debut at the Palais Garnier in the title role of Salammbô by Ernest Reyer. She also sang in Castor et Pollux by Rameau and Thaïs by Massenet.

Her first recorded film was Falstaff in 1911, and she began to work in Hollywood from 1929 onwards. In 1917, she married the director Jacques Feyder, with whom she remained until his death in 1948, having three sons. She appeared in several films under her husband's direction, including Le Grand Jeu (1933), Pension Mimosas (1934), La Kermesse héroïque (Carnival in Flanders) (1935) and Les Gens du voyage (1937). Rosay spent the duration of World War II in England and Switzerland, where she taught acting classes at the Conservatoire de Genève. She still appeared in films during this time, notably the British Halfway House (1944) as the refugee French wife of a British sea captain.

During her career, she appeared with all the great stars of French cinema, including Jean Gabin, Michèle Morgan, Raimu, Jeanne Moreau, Danielle Darrieux, Micheline Presle, Paul Meurisse, Gérard Philipe, Louis Jouvet, Michel Simon, Simone Signoret, Fernandel, and Jean-Louis Barrault. In Hollywood, she co-starred with Charles Boyer, Maurice Chevalier and Buster Keaton and worked with directors such as William Dieterle (September Affair, 1949), Martin Ritt (The Sound and the Fury, 1958), Ronald Neame (The Seventh Sin, 1956), and Peter Glenville (Me and the Colonel, 1957) with Danny Kaye. In England she appeared in The Alien Corn, a segment of the W. Somerset Maugham anthology film Quartet. A highly accomplished pianist herself in real life, she played the role of a famous piano virtuoso who gives aspiring pianist Dirk Bogarde a compassionate but honest and devastating critical appraisal of his likelihood of becoming a great musician – which results in his suicide. She performs in the film Schubert's Impromptu in E flat.

In 1950 she appeared on stage at London's Winter Garden Theatre, playing the title role in 'Madame Tic Tac' but it had only a short run.

It was not until 1938 that her biological father, Count François Louis Bandy de Nalèche, acknowledged her as his daughter.

Her final appearance on film was in the Maximilian Schell-directed Academy Award-nominated and Golden Globe-winner for Best Foreign-Language Foreign Film of 1974, Der Fußgänger (English title: The Pedestrian).

She died in Montgeron, Île-de-France, near Paris. Her grave is located in Sorel-Moussel, Île-de-France, where she is buried with her husband, movie director Jacques Feyder.

There are streets named after Françoise Rosay in Limoges, Montpellier, Chevry-Cossigny, Launaguet and Martigues.

Partial filmography 

 Les Vampires (1915)
 Crainquebille (1922)
 Gribiche (1926)
 Les Deux Timides (Two Timid Souls) (1928)
 Madame Récamier (1928)
 La Chance (Luck) (1931)
 Le Petit Café (The Little Cafe) (1931)
 Papa sans le savoir (A Father Without Knowing It) (1932)
 L'Abbé Constantin (The Abbot Constantine) (1933)
 Le Grand Jeu (1934)
 Die Insel (The Island) (1934)
 Pension Mimosas (1935)
 Marchand d'amour (Merchant of Love) (1935)
 Remous (Whirlpool of Desire) (1935)
 La Kermesse héroïque (Carnival in Flanders) (1935)
 Jenny (1936)
 Die letzten Vier von Santa Cruz (The Last Four on Santa Cruz) (1936)
 Le Secret de Polichinelle (The Secret of Polichinelle) (1936)
 Un carnet de bal (Life Dances On) (1937)
 Drôle de drame (Bizarre, Bizarre) (1937) 
 Mein Sohn, der Herr Minister (My Son the Minister) (1937)
 Les Gens du voyage (People Who Travel) (1938)
 Fahrendes Volk (People Who Travel) (1938)
 Ramuntcho (1938)
 Le Joueur d'échecs (The Chess Player) (1938)
 Serge Panine (1939)
 Elles étaient douze femmes (They Were Twelve Women) (1940)
 Une femme disparaît (1942)
 The Halfway House (1944)
 Johnny Frenchman (1945)
 Macadam (Back Streets of Paris) (1946)
 Saraband for Dead Lovers (1948)
 Quartet (1948)
 Le Mystère Barton (The Barton Mystery) (1949)
 September Affair (1950)
 Donne senza nome (Women Without Names) (1950)
 Maria Chapdelaine (The Naked Heart) (1950)
 The 13th Letter (1951)
 I figli di nessuno (Nobody's Children) (1951)
 L'Auberge rouge (The Red Inn) (1951)
 Wanda la peccatrice (The Shameless Sex) (1952)
 Chi è senza peccato (Who is Without Sin) (1952)
 Le Banquet des fraudeurs (The Smugglers' Banquet) (1952)
 Les Sept Péchés capitaux (The Seven Deadly Sins) (1952)
 La Reine Margot (Queen Margot) (1954)
 That Lady (1955)
 Ragazze d'oggi (Girls of Today) (1955)
 Me and the Colonel (1958)
 Die Gans von Sedan (The Goose of Sedan) (1959)
 The Sound and the Fury (1959)
 Les Yeux de l'amour (Eyes of Love) (1959)
 Stefanie in Rio (1960)
 The Full Treatment (1960)
 Frau Cheneys Ende (The Last of Mrs. Cheyney) (1961)
 La Métamorphose des cloportes (1965)
Faut pas prendre les enfants du bon Dieu pour des canards sauvages (Leontine) (1968)
 Trois milliards sans ascenseur (1972)
 Der Fußgänger (The Pedestrian) (1973)

Bibliography

References

Further reading

External links
 
 
 
 Françoise Rosay at Cinémathèque française 
 Fan Site

1891 births
1974 deaths
French stage actresses
French film actresses
French silent film actresses
Actresses from Paris
20th-century French actresses
20th-century French women singers
French expatriate actresses in the United States